Low light level television (LLLTV) is a type of electronic sensing device, usually a CCD camera sensitive to wavelengths above the normal "visible" (0.4 to 0.7 micrometre) wavelengths, and into the short-wave Infrared - usually to about 1.0 to 1.1 micrometres.  This allows viewing of objects in extremely low light levels, where they would not be seen by the naked eye.  LLLTVs tend to be more affordable than infrared cameras, which typically cover ranges from 3 to 5 μm (MWIR)or 8 to 12 μm (LWIR)

See also
Night vision
Thermographic camera

References

Infrared imaging
Cameras by type